Eppley is a surname. Notable people with the surname include:

Cody Eppley (born 1985), American professional baseball pitcher
Eugene C. Eppley, (1884–1958), hotel magnate in Omaha, Nebraska
Geary Eppley (1895–1978), American university administrator, professor, agronomist, military officer, athlete, and track and field coach
Marion Eppley (1883–1960), American physical chemist

See also
Eppley Foundation, founded in Omaha, Nebraska
Eugene C. Eppley College of Business Administration at Creighton University in Omaha, Nebraska
Eppley Airfield, a medium hub airport three miles northeast of Omaha, Nebraska
Eugene C. Eppley Administration Building, located on the University of Nebraska in Omaha, Nebraska
Eugene C. Eppley Fine Arts Building, located on the Morningside College campus in Sioux City, Iowa
Eugene C. Eppley Center, located on the Michigan State University campus in East Lansing, Michigan
Eppley Hotel Company, located in Omaha, Nebraska
Eppley Institute for Research in Cancer and Allied Diseases at the University of Nebraska Medical Center in Omaha, Nebraska
Eppleby
Epley maneuver